The following is a list of events affecting Philippine television in 2011. Events listed include television show debuts, finales, cancellations, and channel launches, closures and rebrandings, as well as information about controversies and carriage disputes.

Events

February
February 11: Solar Entertainment Corporation partnered with ABS-CBN Corporation to air National Basketball Association (NBA) games over free TV starting February 19, 2011. The games will be aired on Studio 23 (later became S+A) and ABS-CBN, but Solar still airs the games daily on BTV.
February 20: After 5 years of broadcast, Q (VHF 11) ended its commercial operations on Sunday evening until it signed off completely on February 26–27.
February 21: AksyonTV (UHF 41), finally launched as the first news and sports channel in the country's free TV.
February 28: GMA Network's first free-to-air news and public affairs channel in the Philippines on Channel 11, GMA News TV, was officially launched.

March
March 2: ETC moves to Radio Philippines Network (VHF 9) from Southern Broadcasting Network (UHF 21). On the other hand, Talk TV (now CNN Philippines) was launched by Solar Television Network for airing on SBN.
March 13: Joseph the Artist was hailed as the Ultimate Talentado in Talentadong Pinoy Season 2.

May
 May 1: The ABS-CBN News Channel celebrated its 15th anniversary.
 May 14: True Colors wins as Showtimes third grand champion, the grand finals of which were held at Ynares Sports Arena, Antipolo City.

June
June 5: IBC 13 signed a blocktime agreement with TV5 Network Inc.'s sports division Sports5 to air live sports coverage via its new programming block AKTV was officially launched.
June 18: Rizal Technological University was hailed as Eat Bulaga's Pinoy Henyo High Alumni Edition Grand Champion by guessing three words in 50.45 seconds.
June 26: 25-year-old falsetto singer Marcelito Pomoy wins the second season of Pilipinas Got Talent.

July
July 3: BEAM Channel 31 (UHF 31) returns as a test broadcast after 8 years of ceased broadcasting.

August
August 15: BEAM Channel 31 was now affiliated by Solar Television Network as the 4th free-TV station of the said company, and branded as The Game Channel on August 15, 2011, the first all game show programs on free TV.

September
September 12: Shamcey Supsup, Bb. Pilipinas-Universe 2011, was the 3rd Runner-up at Miss Universe 2011 held at São Paulo, Brazil.
September 18: Karl Jonathan Aguilar wins the top prize winner of 2 Million pesos of Who Wants to Be a Millionaire?.

October
October 6: The Movie and Television Review and Classification Board revised the television rating system in order to exercise caution and vigilance with the viewing habits of the viewers.
October 22: Anne Curtis was hailed as Showtime's second anniversary champion.
October 23: Male singing trio Maasinhon Trio win the third season of Pilipinas Got Talent.

November
November 6: Gwendoline Ruais, Miss World-Philippines 2011, was the 1st Runner-up at Miss World 2011 held at London, United Kingdom.
November 7: Dianne Necio, Bb. Pilipinas International 2011, was placed in Top 15 at Miss International 2011 held at Chengdu, China. She even won the Miss Internet Popularity Award.
November 12: Cubilla Family of Leyte was hailed as Eat Bulaga's Pamilyang Pinoy Henyo Grand Champion by guessing three words in 2 minutes and 46.53 seconds.

December
December 3: Athena Mae Imperial, Miss Philippines-Earth 2011, was crowned Miss Water at Miss Earth 2011 held at Quezon City.
 December 10: Astig Pinoy wins as Showtime's fourth grand champion, the grand finals of which were held at Ynares Sports Arena, Antipolo City.
December 24: BEAM Channel 31 (The Game Channel) its broadcast every morning and afternoon, to give way to its new sister network station CHASE (now CT) every evening block was launched by Solar Entertainment Corporation.

Premieres

Unknown
 Health Med (IBC 13)
RX: Nutrisyon at Kalusugan (IBC 13)
FNRI Puppet Videos (IBC 13)
It's My Life with Troy Montero (IBC 13)
Gintong Uhay (IBC 13)
Cooltura (IBC 13)

Returning or renamed programs

Programs transferring networks

Finales

Unknown
Hanep Buhay (GMA 7)
Bagong Maunlad na Agrikultura (IBC 13)
By Request (IBC 13)
Gabay at Aksyon (IBC 13)
Health Med (IBC 13)
News and Views with Abel Cruz (IBC 13)
Nation's Peacemakers (IBC 13)
SSS: Kabalikat Natin (IBC 13)
Signs and Wonders (IBC 13)
This is Your Day (IBC 13)
Tinig ng Kanyang Pagbabalik (IBC 13)

Networks
The following is a list of Free-to-Air and Local Cable Networks making noteworthy launches and closures during 2011.

Launches

Stations changing network affiliation
The following is a list of television stations that have made or will make noteworthy affiliation switches in 2011.

Rebranded
The following is a list of television stations that have made or will make noteworthy network rebranded in 2011.

Closures

Births
 June 5: JJ Quilantang
 November 8: Nate Alcasid, young endorser and actor, the son of Regine Velasquez and Ogie Alcasid
 November 11: Angelika Rama

Deaths
January 5: Alfredo "Freddie" Vargas Jr., 63, father of actor Alfredo "Alfred" Vargas III, cardiac arrest (born 1947)
February 2: Romeo Babao, 73, father of Julius Babao, brain hemorrhage (born 1937)
February 12: Ching Arellano, 50, actor and comedian (born 1960)
March 3: Paquito Diaz, 73, actor and movie director (born 1937)
March 20: John Apacible, 38, model-turned actor, gunshot wound (born 1973)
April 17: AJ Perez, 18, actor, vehicular accident (born 1993)
September 23: Anthony Linsangan, 31, husband of Camille Prats, nasopharyngeal cancer (born 1979)
October 29: Ram Revilla, 23, Filipino actor, half brother of Sen. Ramon "Bong" Revilla Jr. and son of former actor and Sen. Ramon Revilla Sr. (born 1988)
October 31: Ricky Pempengco, 43, estranged father of Charice (born 1968)
November 11: Lito Calzado, 65, former TV director/choreographer and father of actress Iza Calzado, liver cancer (born 1946)
November 23: Magdalena Vargas, 54, mother of teen actor Jhake Vargas colon cancer (born 1957)
December 29: Tyron Perez, 26, Filipino actor, TV host, model, former StarStruck Alumni Batch 1 (born 1985)

See also
2011 in television

References

 
Television in the Philippines by year
Philippine television-related lists